is a Japanese tokusatsu drama in Toei Company's Kamen Rider franchise, being the fourteenth series in the Heisei period run and the twenty-third overall. It began airing on TV Asahi on September 2, 2012, joining Tokumei Sentai Go-Busters and then Zyuden Sentai Kyoryuger in the Super Hero Time lineup. Tsuyoshi Kida is the series' main screenwriter.

In April 2017, TV Japan began broadcasting the series in the United States and Canada.

Story

Six months before the start of the series, a mysterious ritual held on the day of the solar eclipse took place. Its purpose was to give birth to a group of magical creatures called Phantoms through humans with magical potential called "Gates", by forcibly subjecting them to immense despair. Haruto Soma, the survivor of the ritual, and Koyomi, a mysterious girl who has lost all of her memories, are tasked by the mysterious White Wizard to fight the Phantoms. Haruto is also given the WizarDriver to become Kamen Rider Wizard to prevent the Phantoms from transforming other Gates into Phantoms themselves. Later on, a man named Kosuke Nito appears as the ancient wizard Kamen Rider Beast to feed on the Phantom's magical power to survive, and becomes both a rival and ally to Haruto. As the two wizards wage their battle against the Phantoms, who are led by the hotheaded Phoenix, the cold and merciless Medusa, the scheming Gremlin, and the enigmatic Wiseman, things are not all as they seem.

Episodes

Films
Kamen Rider Wizard made his debut in the Kamen Rider Fourze movie, Space, Here We Come!, which was released in Japanese theatres on August 4, 2012.

Movie War Ultimatum

 was released on December 8, 2012, and served as the annual winter "Movie War" film. In the portion featuring the cast and characters of Kamen Rider Wizard, the title character from Shotaro Ishinomori's Bishōjo Mask Poitrine appears. The title team of Shotaro Ishinomori's Akumaizer 3 also appears in the movie as its main antagonists, with Demon Kakka providing the voice of Xatan as well as the performer for its theme song "Forest of Rocks". Kamen Riders OOO, Birth, Double, and Accel also made appearances in the movie. The event of the movie took place between Episode 13 and 14.

Super Hero Taisen Z

 is a film that was released in Japan on April 27, 2013, which featured the first crossover between characters of Toei's three main Tokusatsu franchises, Kamen Rider, Super Sentai, and the Space Sheriff Series representing the Metal Hero Series as a whole. The protagonists of Space Sheriff Gavan: The Movie, Tokumei Sentai Go-Busters, and Kaizoku Sentai Gokaiger are featured, but the casts of Kamen Rider Wizard, Zyuden Sentai Kyoryuger, and Kamen Rider Fourze also participate in the film. The Space Ironmen Kyodain from Kamen Rider Fourze the Movie: Space, Here We Come! also made an appearance. The teaser for the film was shown after Kamen Rider × Kamen Rider Wizard & Fourze: Movie War Ultimatum. The event of the movie took place between Episode 27 and 28.

In Magic Land

As with every year, Kamen Rider Wizard appears in his own film titled  that was released in theaters on August 3, 2013, double-billed with the film for Zyuden Sentai Kyoryuger. The film features Takanori Jinnai as the film's villain Minister Auma who transforms into Kamen Rider Sorcerer. Jinnai is the oldest person to portray a Kamen Rider to date at age 54; the record was previously held by Hiroyuki Watanabe for his portrayal of Kamen Rider Gaoh in Kamen Rider Den-O: I'm Born! who at the time of filming was 51. The event of the movie took place between Episode 39 and 40.

The Fateful Sengoku Movie Battle

 was the annual winter "Movie Wars" film, featuring a crossover between the cast and characters from Kamen Rider Gaim and Kamen Rider Wizard. A short teaser of the film was first shown during the screening of Kamen Rider Wizard in Magic Land, with a new teaser shown after the finale of Wizard revealing the release date to be December 14, 2013.

Kamen Rider Taisen

 made its theater debut on March 29, 2014. Masahiro Inoue, playing Kamen Rider Decade, alongside many other lead actors of other series appear in the film, including Gaku Sano of Kamen Rider Gaim, Renn Kiriyama of Kamen Rider W, Kohei Murakami and Kento Handa of Kamen Rider 555, Shunya Shiraishi from Kamen Rider Wizard, Ryo Hayami of Kamen Rider X, and Hiroshi Fujioka of the original Kamen Rider. The Sentai teams' Ressha Sentai ToQger and Ryo Ryusei as Daigo Kiryu from Zyuden Sentai Kyoryuger were also in the movie. Shun Sugata playing Kamen Rider ZX from the Birth of the 10th! Kamen Riders All Together!! TV special returns, also performing as Ambassador Darkness. Itsuji Itao of Kamen Rider The First played Ren Aoi, Kamen Rider Fifteen, a main antagonist of the film.

Kamen Rider Heisei Generations
A Movie War film, titled , was released in Japan on December 10, 2016. The film features Kamen Rider Wizard teaming up with Kamen Rider Ex-Aid, Kamen Rider Ghost, Kamen Rider Drive, and Kamen Rider Gaim as they battle against a virus based on Bandai Namco Entertainment's video game character, Pac-Man. The professional wrestler Hiroshi Tanahashi was announced to be one of the main antagonists of the movie.

Video games
A port of Kamen Rider: Climax Heroes titled  was released for both the PlayStation Portable and Nintendo Wii during Winter 2012. In addition to adding Kamen Rider Wizard to the game, there are new features in the game. Kamen Rider: Battride War for the PlayStation 3 is also a game featuring Kamen Rider Wizard alongside his predecessors up through Kamen Rider Kuuga.

Production
Trademarks on the title were filed by Toei on June 21, 2012, and it was officially revealed on June 27, 2012.

Hyper Battle DVD
The Hyper Battle DVD for Wizard is titled . Haruto and Kosuke go into the Donut Shop Manager's Underworld and use the powers of the Dance Ring.

Novel
, written by Tsuyoshi Kida, is part of a series of spin-off novel adaptions of the Heisei Era Kamen Riders. The events of the novel take place after Kamen Rider × Kamen Rider Gaim & Wizard: The Fateful Sengoku Movie Battle. The novel was released on November 1, 2014.

Cast
 : 
 : 
 : 
 : 
 :  
 : 
 , : 
 : 
 : 
 Manager of donut shop: 
 Worker at donut shop: 
 Chief of police: 
 : 
 : 
 : 
 : 
 : 
 : 
 : 
 : 
 : , 
 Narration:

Guest cast

 : 
 : 
 : 
 : 
 Orphanage director (16): 
 Fortune teller (17): 
 Shinto priest (18): 
 Conductor (20, 21): Izam
 : 
 : 
 : 
 : 
 : 
 : 
 :

Theme songs
Opening theme
 "Life is SHOW TIME"
 Lyrics: Shoko Fujibayashi
 Composition & Arrangement: tatsuo (of everset)
 Artist: 
The series' theme song was performed by Shō Kiryūin of Golden Bomber as his solo debut single.

Insert themes
 "Last Engage"
 Lyrics: Shoko Fujibayashi
 Composition & Arrangement: Ryo (of defspiral)
 Artist: Kamen Rider Girls
 Episodes: 4, 10
The theme of Kamen Rider Wizard Flame Style.
 "Mystic Liquid"
 Lyrics: Shoko Fujibayashi
 Composition & Arrangement: Ryo (of defspiral)
 Artist: Kamen Rider Girls
 Episodes: 3, 4, 15
The theme of Kamen Rider Wizard Water Style.
 "Blessed wind"
 Lyrics: Shoko Fujibayashi
 Composition: Yoshio Nomura
 Arrangement: Rider Chips
 Artist: Rider Chips
 Episodes: 5, 13
The theme of Kamen Rider Wizard Hurricane Style.
 "Strength of the earth"
 Lyrics: Shoko Fujibayashi
 Composition: Yoshio Nomura
 Arrangement: Rider Chips
 Artist: Rider Chips
 Episodes: 6, 7, 10, 17
The theme of Kamen Rider Wizard Land Style.
 "Just The Beginning"
 Lyrics: Shoko Fujibayashi
 Composition & Arrangement: AYANO (of FULL AHEAD)
 Artist: Kamen Rider Girls
 Episodes: 9, 12
The theme of Kamen Rider Wizard Flame, Water, Hurricane and Land Dragon.
 "BEASTBITE"
 Lyrics: Shoko Fujibayashi
 Composition: Yoshio Nomura
 Arrangement: Rider Chips
 Artist: Rider Chips
 Episodes: 17–19, 34
The theme of Kamen Rider Beast.
 "alteration"
 Lyrics: Shoko Fujibayashi
 Composition & Arrangement: Shuhei Naruse
 Artist: Kamen Rider Girls
 Episodes: 26
The theme of Kamen Rider Wizard All Dragon and Dragon Fourmation.
 "Missing piece"
 Lyrics: Shoko Fujibayashi
 Composition & Arrangement: Ryo (of defspiral)
 Artist: Kamen Rider Girls
 Episodes: 31, 32, 37, 39, 45
The theme of Kamen Rider Wizard Infinity Style.

The original soundtrack for Wizard was released on November 21, 2012. A compilation album subtitled the Music Magic Collection featuring all of the theme songs seen on the show and its movies was released on September 4, 2013.

References

External links

Official website at Toei Company

 
Wizard
Television about magic
2012 Japanese television series debuts
2013 Japanese television series endings
TV Asahi original programming
Japanese supernatural television series
Japanese horror fiction television series
Japanese fantasy television series
Dark fantasy television series